Walter Gordon Bennett (26 March 1906 – 11 September 1979) was a rugby union player who represented Australia.

Bennett, a scrum-half, was born in Brisbane, Queensland and claimed a total of four international rugby caps for Australia. He was educated at the Anglican Church Grammar School.

References

Australian rugby union players
Australia international rugby union players
1906 births
1979 deaths
People educated at Anglican Church Grammar School
Rugby union players from Brisbane
Rugby union scrum-halves